Graeme Bennett (born 7 May 1965) is a Scottish former football midfielder. Now retired, he held the position of Director of football at Inverness Caledonian Thistle F.C.

As a player the combative Bennett made his Scottish Football League debut for the newly created Inverness club in their first season in existence. He eventually left the club to become player-manager of Clachnacuddin F.C. and concentrate on his double glazing firm but soon returned in the director's role. Although overseeing a fairly regular turnover of men in the managerial role, Bennett has been constant in the director's role since the days of Steve Paterson.

Bennett also held the position of vice-chairman of the club. Following the club's relegation in 2009 his director of football role became unsalaried as the club made a series a cost-cutting measures.

References

External links

Inverness Caledonian Thistle Board of Directors

1965 births
Inverness Caledonian Thistle F.C.
Inverness Caledonian Thistle F.C. players
Living people
Scottish businesspeople
Scottish footballers
Scottish Football League players
Clachnacuddin F.C. players
Association football midfielders